The 2014 United States Senate election in Oregon took place on November 4, 2014 to elect a member of the United States Senate to represent the State of Oregon, concurrently with the election of the Governor of Oregon, as well as other elections to the United States Senate in other states and elections to the United States House of Representatives and various state and local elections.

Incumbent Democratic Senator Jeff Merkley successfully ran for reelection to a second term. Despite it being a national midterm Republican wave, this was actually his best Senate election in terms of margin of victory, winning by almost 20%. Primary elections were held on May 20, 2014. Merkley easily won the Democratic nomination, while the Republicans nominated pediatric neurosurgeon Monica Wehby. Initially, the race was considered potentially competitive, but Wehby's campaign collapsed after she faced multiple allegations of stalking and harassment from former partners, and was found to have plagiarized portions of her campaign website.

Background 
Democrat Jeff Merkley, the Speaker of the Oregon House of Representatives, had narrowly defeated two-term Republican incumbent Gordon H. Smith with 49% of the vote in 2008.

Democratic primary

Candidates

Declared 
 William Bryk, attorney from New York and perennial candidate
 Pavel Goberman, fitness instructor and perennial candidate
 Jeff Merkley, incumbent Senator

Results

Republican primary

Candidates

Declared 
 Mark Callahan, information technology consultant and perennial candidate
 Jason Conger, state representative
 Tim Crawley, attorney
 Jo Rae Perkins, former Chairwoman of the Linn County Republican Party and candidate for Mayor of Albany in 2010
 Monica Wehby, pediatric neurosurgeon

Withdrew 
 Sam Carpenter, businessman

Declined 
 Bruce Hanna, state representative
 Rick Miller, owner and founder of Avamere
 Gordon H. Smith, former U.S. Senator
 Greg Walden, U.S. Representative and Chairman of the National Republican Congressional Committee

Endorsements

Polling

Results

Independents 
The filing deadline for independent candidates is August 26, 2014.  In order to qualify, a candidate must submit 17,893 signatures of registered voters or obtain signatures from at least 1,000 electors at a valid assembly of electors.

Candidates

Declared 
 Karl King, massage therapist

General election

Debates 
 Complete video of debate, October 14, 2014

Predictions

Polling 

 ^ Internal poll for Dennis Richardson campaign
 * Internal poll for Monica Wehby campaign

Results

See also 
 2014 United States Senate elections
 2014 United States elections
 2014 Oregon gubernatorial election

References

External links 
 U.S. Senate elections in Oregon, 2014 at Ballotpedia
 Campaign contributions at OpenSecrets

Official campaign websites (Archived)
 Jeff Merkley for U.S. Senate incumbent
 Mark Callahan for U.S. Senate
 Jason Conger for U.S. Senate
 Tim Crawley for U.S. Senate
 Pavel Goberman for U.S. Senate
 Karl King for U.S. Senate
 Jo Rae Perkins for U.S. Senate
 Monica Wehby for U.S. Senate

2014
Oregon
Senate